Chuvash State Academic Song and Dance Ensemble is a Russian art collective, originally named the Chuvash National Choir.

History
The team was founded in 1924 by Chuvash professional music composers and choral conductors F.P. Pavlov (1892–1931) and V.P. Vorobyov (1887–1954) as the Chuvash National Choir.

Its leaders began to gather and process Chuvash folk songs, performing them for the public in Chuvashia and throughout Russia.

The group followed an ethnographic interest in choir performances and a high performing culture.

In the 1920s the choir toured in Moscow, Leningrad and Gorky. Chuvash State Choir was the winner of the All-Union Choir Olympiad peoples of the USSR. It was awarded the Prize of the All-Union Radiofestival and performed in the Kremlin. In 1994 he was awarded the title of "Academic". During these years, the repertoire of the Choir added classical and contemporary music, as well as the music of the peoples of the USSR.

Ensemble
In 1939 the Chuvash National Choir was renamed the Chuvash State Song and Dance Ensemble. In the late 1930s, ensembles of song and dance emerged across the country. The first artistic director was a young composer and conductor A.G. Orlov-Shuzm (1914–1996). Under his leadership the ensemble successfully performed in Moscow, music and dance of the RSFSR peoples. Later the ensemble was led by conductor Kazatchkov S.A. (1909–2005).

The Ensemble performed in many countries.

World War II

The activity continued during World War II. The Ensemble stayed three-months at the Bryansk and Kalinin Fronts in the winter of 1943.

Recognition 

 Winner of All-Union and All-Russian review, 
 Laureate of the State K. Ivanov's Prize of the Chuvash Republic 
 Team was awarded the title "academic" ensemble (1994).
 Honorary diploma of the Chuvash Republic (2009).

See also 
 Chuvash State Symphony Capella
 Cheboksary Pavlov's Music College

Literature 
 Кондратьев М. Г. Государственный ансамбль песни и танца Чувашской АССР: История возникновения. Этапы развития. Творческие искания. – Cheboksary, 1989.
 Кондратьев М. Г. Государственный ансамбль песни и танца Чувашской Республики. Справочник (1924–1991). – Cheboksary, 1992.
 Кондратьев М. Г. Чувашская музыка : От мифологических времён до становления современного профессионализма. – М., 2007.
 Кондратьев М. Г. Чувашский государственный академический ансамбль песни и танца. Альбом-буклет. – Cheboksary, 2014.

External links
 Song and dance ensemble of the Chuvash State
 About the enstmble 
 Grassroots Chuvash’s  Suite
 Chuvash song and dance ensemble performed on Chinese soil
 Song and Dance Ensemble flew to Mexico
 Official site of the Chuvash State Academic Song and Dance Ensemble

Russian folk music groups
Soviet performing ensembles
Russian choirs
Musical groups established in 1924
Culture of Chuvashia
Chuvash culture